Graziella Bertocchi is an Italian economist and Professor of Economics at the University of Modena and Reggio Emilia in Modena, Italy. She is known for her work connecting economic growth within a historical perspective.

Education and career 
Bertocchi's undergraduate degree is from the University of Modena (1980). She earned an M.A. from the University of Pennsylvania in 1983, and went on to receive a Ph.D. from the University of Pennsylvania in 1988. She held an assistant professor position at Brown University, and then returned to the University of Modena and Reggio Emilia in 1993. She has been a full professor since 2000. She is the president of the Einaudi Institute for Economics and Finance in Rome, Italy.

Academic work 
Bertocchi has written on race, women in the economy and politics, as well as labor issues and the logic of enfranchisement. Her primary fields of study are macroeconomics, political economy, and family economic. Bertocchi's work on race has examined the link between slavery in the 1860s and present-day economic inequalities; this was covered by Pacific Standard. Bertocchi has also spoken on women and mathematics and the perceptions of mathematical ability in women. Her work on the impact of the COVID-19 pandemic on black women has been discussed in the media. She has also addressed the economic impact of the pandemic on Europe. 

Bertocchi ranks highly in citations according to Research Papers in Economics; as of 2021, she is ranked in the top 5% of economics overall and has an h-index at Google Scholar of 24.

Selected publications

Honors and awards 
Bertocchi was named a fellow of the Global Labor Organization in 2017. She is also a senior fellow of the Rimini Centre for Economic Analysis.

References

External links 

, March 31, 2021

University of Modena alumni
University of Pennsylvania School of Arts and Sciences alumni
Academic staff of the University of Modena and Reggio Emilia
Women economists

Living people

Year of birth missing (living people)